Benedek Bendegúz Kovács (born 18 May 1998) is a Hungarian swimmer. He competed in the 2020 Summer Olympics.

References

1998 births
Living people
Swimmers at the 2020 Summer Olympics
Hungarian male swimmers
Olympic swimmers of Hungary
Sportspeople from Budapest
20th-century Hungarian people
21st-century Hungarian people
European Aquatics Championships medalists in swimming